Noel Campbell Orange (10 August 1939 – 14 July 1995) was an Australian rules footballer who played with South Melbourne in the Victorian Football League (VFL).

Notes

External links 

1939 births
1995 deaths
Australian rules footballers from Victoria (Australia)
Sydney Swans players
Yarraville Football Club players